Katie Drabot (born September 2, 1997) is an American swimmer specializing in freestyle. She placed second behind Siobhan Haughey in the 200 m freestyle at the 2017 University Games in Taipei. She currently attends and swims for Stanford University. She was also a part of the American record-breaking 800 freestyle relay at the 2017 Pac-12 Championships, along with Lia Neal, Ella Eastin, and Katie Ledecky.

References

External links
 
 

1997 births
Living people
American female butterfly swimmers
American female freestyle swimmers
World Aquatics Championships medalists in swimming
Universiade medalists in swimming
Universiade silver medalists for the United States
Universiade bronze medalists for the United States
Medalists at the 2017 Summer Universiade
Stanford Cardinal women's swimmers